Exodeoxyribonucleases are both exonucleases and deoxyribonucleases. They catalyze digestion of the ends of linear DNA. They are a type of esterase. They are classified EC 3.1.11.

See also
 Deoxyribonuclease

External links
 

EC 3.1
Deoxyribonucleases